Sjoerd Joustra (3 January 1916 – 7 July 2001) was a Dutch architect. His work was part of the architecture event in the art competition at the 1948 Summer Olympics.

References

1916 births
2001 deaths
20th-century Dutch architects
Olympic competitors in art competitions
People from Sneek